The Hospital of St Mary Magdalene, Bawtry was a charity established in Bawtry in the thirteenth century. The surviving chapel building is now a masonic lodge and Grade II listed.

History
It was probably in the episcopacy of Geoffrey Plantagenet or his immediate predecessor, that the foundation of St. Mary Magdalene was laid, and it has remained under patronage of the Archbishop of York up to the present time. (1891)  ..... in the year 1289 the first recorded name if its incumbents occurs, The Rev.THomas langtoft.

 
The exact date of the foundation of the hospital is uncertain but it was in existence by the end of the thirteenth century. The patronage for the appointment of the Master was in the hands of the Archbishops of York. Archbishop William de Wickwane granted permission for Gilbert and his wife to live in the hospital in 1281.

In 1390, Robert Morton extended the foundation by granting Nostell Priory a sum of money which was to be used to fund a chaplain to the Hospital. On his death in 1396 a sum of money was also left directly to the hospital.

The purpose of the hospital was as a place of residence for the poor.

It survived the dissolution of the monasteries but through the lack of care of subsequent masters, by 1834 the chapel was derelict. It was restored in 1839 by Mr. Edward Harwood Greaves of Hesley Hall.

The chapel fell into disuse again in the 1920s and was converted into a masonic lodge in 1930 when the almshouses were demolished.

Masters of Bawtry Hospital

Roger, 1280 
Thomas de Langtoft, 1289 
Roger, 1299 
Adam Usflet, c. 1320 
Elyas de Thoreston, resigned 1361
John de Grandle, 1361 
Henry Barton, resigned 1363 
Roger de Nassington, 1363 
Robert del Strete, occurs 1390 
William Myrfyne, occurs 1403 
Roger Malton, died 1421 
William Sadeler, 1421 
Thomas Wirell, c. 1450 
John Hawkins, c. 1510 
William Hollgill, occurs 1527 
Richard Pygott, occurs 1534 
William Clayburgh, S.T.P., 1549 
John Houseman, resigned 1584 
James Brewster, 1584 
John Cooper, 1590 
John Slacke, 1610
Walter Bernard 1643
John Lake 1674
Samuel Crowbrow 1683
Benjamin Day 1690
John Ludlam 1732
John Ella 1752
William Hodges 1803
John Rudd 1816
William Henry Downes 1834

References

Bawtry
Bawtry
Bawtry
Grade II listed almshouses